Davy Crockett, Indian Scout is a 1950 American Western film directed by Lew Landers and starring George Montgomery and Ellen Drew. Wartime hero Johnny McKee had a small role in the film, as did Jim Thorpe. The film was shot at the Motion Picture Centre, with filming commencing June 1948. Much of the footage was taken from the 1940 film Kit Carson, starring Jon Hall, Dana Andrews, and Clayton Moore.

Plot
During the 1840s, a wagon train is headed west with Davy Crockett (George Montgomery), a young man who shares a name with his famous frontiersman uncle, acting as one of the train's Native American scouts. After the passengers narrowly survive a series of ambushes from Native Americans, they come to believe that a spy is on board, helping plot the attacks. Suspicions fall on Davy's innocent partner, Red Hawk (Philip Reed), so he and Davy set out to find the real culprit.

Cast
 George Montgomery as Davy Crockett
 Ellen Drew as Frances Oatman
 Phillip Reed as Red Hawk
 Noah Beery Jr. as Tex McGee
 Paul Guilfoyle as Ben
 Addison Richards as Capt. Weightman
 Robert Barrat as James Lone Eagle
 Erik Rolf as Mr. Simms
 William Wilkerson as High Tree
 John Hamilton as Col. Willard
 Vera Marshe as Mrs. Simms
 Jimmy Moss as Jimmy Simms
 Chief Thundercloud as Sleeping Fox
 Kenne Duncan as Sgt. Gordon (as Kenneth Duncan)
 Ray Teal as Capt. McHale

References

External links
 
 
 
 

1950 films
Films set in the 1840s
American black-and-white films
American Western (genre) films
1950 Western (genre) films
Films produced by Edward Small
Films scored by Paul Sawtell
1950s English-language films
Films directed by Lew Landers
1950s American films
Films with screenplays by Richard Schayer
Cultural depictions of Davy Crockett